Farm to Market Roads in Texas are owned and maintained by the Texas Department of Transportation (TxDOT).

FM 900

Farm to Market Road 900 (FM 900) is located in Hopkins and Franklin counties.

FM 900 begins at an intersection with FM 115 near Lake Cypress Springs. The highway travels in a generally westward direction to the town of Purley, where it has a short overlap with SH 37. After the overlap, FM 900 continues to run west before turning north near Hopkins County Road 3372. The highway crosses over I-30 before entering the town of Saltillo where it has an overlap with US 67. FM 900 continues to run north before turning northwest then to the west to its northern terminus at FM 69.

On July 21, 1949, the highway was extended westward to the Franklin-Hopkins county line. On September 28, 1949, FM 900 was extended westward and northward to US 67 in Saltillo and absorbed FM 908. On November 24, 1950, FM 900 was extended northward from US 67 to FM 270. On August 15, 1968, the highway was extended southeastward to its current southern terminus at FM 115.

Junction list

FM 901

FM 902

FM 903

FM 904

FM 905

FM 906

FM 907

FM 907 (1948)

The original FM 907 was designated on November 23, 1948, from US 82 north of Brookston north and west to Maxey. FM 907 was cancelled on February 1, 1949, and became a portion of FM 38.

FM 908

FM 908 (1948)

The original FM 908 was designated on November 23, 1948, from US 67 at Saltillo south to Greenwood. FM 908 was cancelled on September 28, 1949, and became a portion of FM 900.

FM 909

FM 910

FM 911

FM 912

FM 912 (1948)

The original FM 912 was designated on November 23, 1948, from US 67 at Dublin north to Lingleville. FM 912 was cancelled on February 6, 1953, and its mileage was transferred to FM 219.

FM 913

FM 914

RM 915

 Originally FM 915.

FM 915 (1948)

FM 915 was designated on November 23, 1948, from US 377 in Tolar south . The route was cancelled on May 23, 1951, and became a portion of FM 201.

FM 916

FM 917

Farm to Market Road 917 is located in Johnson County. It runs from SH 171 in Godley to US 287 near Mansfield.

FM 917 was designated on November 23, 1948 from US 81 (now IH 35W) northwest of Alvarado northeast 4.3 miles towards Lillian. On July 14, 1949 the road was extended northeast 2.4 miles to Lillian. On October 2, 1951 the road was extended to SH 171 in Godley, replacing FM 918. On January 24, 1954 a break in the route was added at US 81 and the road was extended to US 287 (now US 287 Bus.) near Mansfield, replacing FM 2477. On December 15, 1974 the break in the route at US 81 was removed due to construction of IH 35W. On February 27, 2003 FM 917 was rerouted around Lillian; the section from Thomas Lane northeast to FM 2738 was removed altogether and the section from existing FM 2738 to Becky Lane became a section of FM 2738. However, seven months later FM 2738 was modified to run west and south to new FM 917 instead of east (the section from FM 2738 east to new FM 917 was returned to the county). On April 30, 2015 FM 917 was extended southeast over Business US 287-P to US 287.

FM 918

FM 918 (1948–1951)

The first use of the FM 918 designation was on November 23, 1948, in Johnson County, from SH 174 in Joshua to Egan. On July 14, 1949, the road was extended west  to a road intersection. On May 23, 1951, the road was extended west  to SH 171 and east  to US 81 (now I-35W). FM 918 was cancelled on October 2, 1951, and became a portion of FM 917.

FM 918 (1953–1962)

The second use of the FM 918 designation was on October 28, 1953, in Navarro County, from FM 55 in Dresden to SH 22 near Corsicana. On September 21, 1955, FM 918 was extended west to FM 639 at Bush Prairie. FM 918 was cancelled on October 29, 1962, and became a portion of FM 744.

FM 919

FM 920

Farm to Market Road 920 (FM 920) is located in Parker and Wise counties. It runs from Weatherford to Bridgeport. The route was designated on November 23, 1948, from FM 51 in Weatherford northward  to Boonsville. On July 14, 1949, FM 920 was extended north to SH 24 (now US 380).

Junction list

FM 921

Farm to Market Road 921 (FM 921) is located in Cherokee County. It runs from US 79 east of Neches, north to a county road east of the Anderson County line.

FM 921 was designated on November 24, 1959, along its current route.

FM 921 (1948)

FM 921 was previously designated on November 23, 1948, from US 82 west of Menkins, south to Black Flat. This designation was cancelled on February 2, 1959, and transferred to FM 368.

FM 922

Farm to Market Road 922 (FM 922) is a two-lane route that connects the farming areas of Montague, Cooke, and Grayson counties. It runs from FM 455 in Forestburg to U.S. Highway 377 (US 377) near Tioga. FM 922 also crosses Lake Ray Roberts in Cooke County and intersects with other various county secondary roads.

FM 922 was designated on November 23, 1948, from FM 51 near Era to US 77 in Valley View. On July 14, 1949, FM 922 was extended east  to what is now FM 2071. On November 20, 1951, FM 922 was extended west  to a road intersection. On October 31, 1957, FM 922 was extended west to FM 455. On June 1, 1965, FM 922 was extended southeast . On May 5, 1966, FM 922 was extended east  to FM 372. On August 31, 1981, FM 922 was extended east to US 377.

FM 923

Farm to Market Road 923 (FM 923) is located in Throckmorton County. The road begins at U.S. Highway 183 (US 183) northwest of Woodson, and continues north, then west, then eventually back north, ending a few miles west of Throckmorton at US 380.

FM 923 was designated on November 23, 1948, from SH 24 (now US 380) 4 miles west of Throckmorton south and east to US 183. On February 25, 1949, the road was rerouted so that it ended at SH 24 2 miles west of Throckmorton. On September 29, 1954, FM 923 was extended east and south  to a road intersection. On October 31, 1957, FM 923 was extended south and east to US 183, completing its current route.

FM 924

FM 925

FM 926

Farm to Market Road 926 (FM 926) is located in Young County. The road begins at U.S. Highway 380 (US 380) in Newcastle and continues northwest eventually ending at SH 79 south of Padgett.

FM 926 was designated on November 23, 1948, from SH 251 in Newcastle northwest  to a road intersection. On December 16, 1948, FM 926 was extended northwest to SH 79. On February 23, 1993, the section of SH 251 from FM 926 to US 380 was transferred to FM 926.

FM 927

FM 928

FM 928 (1948)

FM 928 was cancelled on July 14, 1949, and became a portion of FM 182.

FM 929

FM 930

FM 931

Farm to Market Road 931 is located in Coryell County. It runs from SH 36 at Flat to CR 348 and CR 344 northeast of Leon Junction.

FM 931 was designated on November 23, 1948 from SH 36 at Flat south 3.3 miles to a county road. On December 17, 1952, the road was extended northeast 4.7 miles to a point 1 mile northeast of Leon Junction. On May 1, 1965 a section from 1.7 miles south of SH 36 south 1.6 miles was removed from the highway system due to expansion of the Fort Hood Military Reservation. On March 27, 2014, the remainder of FM 931 south of SH 36 was removed and turned over to Coryell County.

FM 932

FM 933

FM 934

FM 935

FM 936

FM 937

FM 938

FM 939

FM 940

FM 940 (1948)

The first use of the FM 940 designation was in Nacogdoches County, from FM 225, 5 miles south of Cushing, to Lilbert. FM 940 was cancelled on December 17, 1952, and transferred to FM 343.

FM 940 (1952)

The second use of the FM 940 designation was in Nolan County, from US 80 (now I-20) east to FM 608 near the southern city limit of Roscoe. FM 940 was cancelled on April 1, 1958, when US 80 was rerouted over it.

FM 941

FM 942

FM 943

FM 944

FM 945

FM 946

FM 947

FM 948
Farm to Market Road 948 (FM 948) is a designation that has been used twice. No highway currently uses the FM 948 designation.

FM 948 (1948)

The first use of the FM 948 designation was in Trinity County, from SH 94, northwest  to a road intersection on Mossy Creek Road. On November 20, 1951, the road was extended northwest  to another road intersection. FM 948 was cancelled on January 23, 1953, and became a portion of FM 358.

FM 948 (1954)

The second use of the FM 948 designation was in Dickens and Kent counties from SH 70, 5 miles southeast of Spur, south to US 380 at or near Claremont. On February 23, 1956, FM 948 was signed, but not designated, as SH 208. FM 948 was cancelled on August 29, 1990, as the extension of the SH 208 designation became official.

FM 949

Farm to Market Road 949 (FM 949) is located in Colorado and Austin counties. It runs from FM 102 to SH 36 near Peters.

FM 949 was designated on November 23, 1948, from US 90, 7.5 miles east of Columbus, to Bernardo. On July 18, 1955, a section from FM 102 north to US 90 was added. On November 3, 1972, the road was extended  to the end of FM 1088, replacing it to SH 36.

FM 950

FM 951

FM 952

FM 953

FM 954

FM 955

Farm to Market Road 955 (FM 955) is located in Fayette County. It runs from SH 71 near Ellinger to SH 159 in Fayetteville.

FM 148 was designated on November 23, 1948, along its current route.

FM 956

FM 957

FM 958

FM 959

FM 959 (1948)

The original FM 959 was designated on November 23, 1948, from SH 295 south of Hallettsville to Ezzell. FM 959 was cancelled on July 14, 1949, and became a portion of FM 531.

FM 960

FM 961

RM 962

Ranch to Market Road 962 (RM 962) is located in Llano and Blanco counties.

RM 962 begins at an intersection with SH 71 near Horseshoe Bay and runs in a generally southward direction until an intersection with RM 3347, where it turns southeast. The highway enters the town of Round Mountain, where it shares a short overlap with US 281. After Round Mountain, RM 962 continues to run southeast and turns towards the south before turning towards the east in Cypress Mill. Just east of Rockling Lane, state maintenance ends with the road continuing as Hamilton Pool Road towards western Austin.

 RM 962 was designated on November 23, 1948, as FM 962, running from US 281 in Round Mountain to Cypress Mill. On August 24, 1955, the FM 962 designation was changed to RM 962 and the highway was extended to RM 93 (now SH 71). On August 31, 1965, RM 962 was extended to the Blanco-Travis county line with a spur connection to Cypress Mill being created.

Junction list

RM 963

Ranch to Market Road 963 (RM 963) is located in Burnet County.

RM 963 begins at an intersection with US 281 in Burnet. The highway travels east along Graves Street before turning towards the north at Shady Grove Road. After leaving the city limits of Burnet, RM 963 travels through rural areas of the county in a generally northeast direction. Near RM 2340, the highway turns into a more eastward direction and crosses over the North Fork San Gabriel River. RM 963 turns back towards the north near County Road 210 and runs parallel to Rocky Creek from US 183 to the highway's terminus at FM 2657 near Oakalla.

 RM 963 was designated on November 23, 1948, as FM 963, running from US 281 northeast . On November 20, 1951, the highway was extended to a point  to the northeast. On March 31, 1955, FM 963 was extended northeast  miles to Watson. On April 12, 1955, the road extended northeast to Oakalla, replacing FM 1321. On October 1, 1956, the FM 963 designation was changed to RM 963. The highway was extended to Briggs on May 6, 1964. On June 6, 1967, the section of highway from Oakalla to Briggs was transferred to FM 2657.

Junction list

FM 964

FM 964 (1948)

The original FM 964 was designated on November 23, 1948, from SH 80 at Fentress northeast . On July 14, 1949, the road was extended north . On June 21, 1951, the road was extended to PR 10. On July 20, 1953, the road was extended northeast to US 183 in Lockhart, replacing a  section of PR 10. On September 29, 1954, the road was extended southwest to the Guadalupe County Line. On October 21, 1954, the road extended to FM 621 near Staples, replacing FM 1981. FM 964 was cancelled on April 18, 1958, and transferred to FM 20, although the route remained signed as FM 964 until the 1959 travel map was released.

RM 965

Ranch to Market Road 965 (RM 965) is located in Gillespie and Llano counties.

RM 965 begins at an intersection with US 87/US 290 in Fredericksburg. The highway runs northeast along Milam Street and turns north before leaving the city limits. RM 965 runs through rural areas of Gillespie County, running pass many farms and ranches and zigzags through hilly terrain before entering the town of Crabapple. North of Crabapple, the highway passes by the Enchanted Rock State Natural Area. Near Enchanted Rock, RM 965 turns northeast and enters Llano County before ending at an intersection with SH 16.

 RM 965 was designated on November 23, 1948, as FM 965, running north from US 87/US 290  to a point near Crab Apple Creek. On October 1, 1956, the FM 965 designation was changed to RM 965. On October 31, 1957, RM 965 was extended northward to Enchanted Rock. On May 2, 1962, the highway was extended northeast to its current terminus at SH 16.

Junction list

FM 966

FM 966 (1948)

The original FM 966 was designated on November 23, 1948, from FM 12 near Dripping Springs to Driftwood. On November 20, 1951, the road was extended southeast to FM 1078 at Hays City. FM 966 was cancelled on May 25, 1955, and became a portion of FM 150 (now RM 150).

RM 967

Ranch to Market Road 967 (RM 967) is located in Hays County.

RM 967 begins at an intersection with RM 1826 near the town of Driftwood. The highway travels eastward and passes by a rural subdivision before traveling through less developed areas of the county. RM 967 has an intersection with FM 1626 just south of Hays, before entering the city limits of Buda. The highway turns towards the south and turns southeast before intersecting Main Street (former Loop 4). RM 967 runs south on Main Street before ending at the southbound frontage road of I-35.

On July 14, 1949, the highway was extended  to Carpenter. FM 967 was extended again on October 28, 1953, adding another . On August 24, 1954, FM 967 was extended to a road intersection (current RM 1826). On October 1, 1956, the FM 967 designation was changed to RM 967. On May 27, 2004, RM 967 was extended to I-35, absorbing the southern half of Loop 4.

Junction list

FM 968

FM 968 (1948)

The original FM 968 was designated on November 23, 1948, from SH 29 west of Llano to Valley Springs. This was part of the cancelled SH 81 before 1939. FM 968 was cancelled on July 14, 1949, and became a portion of FM 386 (now RM 386). This became part of FM 734 in 1952, and SH 71 on September 1, 1965 (signs did not change from FM 734 until January 1, 1966).

FM 969

FM 970

Farm to Market Road 970 (FM 970) is located in Williamson County.

The western terminus of FM 970 is at US 183. The road passes through the community of Andice before turning to the north-northwest. FM 970 curves to the east-northeast again before crossing Berry Creek.
The road again turns north-northwest, then east-northeast, and crosses into Florence before reaching its eastern terminus at SH 195.

FM 970 was designated November 23, 1948, along the current route.

FM 971

Farm to Market Road 971 (FM 971) is located in Williamson County. It runs from Business I-35 north of Georgetown east via Weir to SH 95 at Granger.

FM 971 was designated on July 28, 1959, from SH 95 in Granger to Friendship as a replacement of a section of FM 972 (this section was originally FM 971). On June 2, 1967, the road was extended west to Business I-35-M (former Loop 418) north of Georgetown, replacing the -mile FM 2983 on the eastern section and the -mile FM 2606 on the western section, and  connecting the sections.

FM 971 (1948)

The original FM 971 was designated on November 23, 1948, from SH 95 in Granger to Friendship. FM 971 was cancelled on November 26, 1958, and transferred to FM 972.

FM 972

Farm to Market Road 972 (FM 972) is located in Williamson County. It runs from I-35 north of Georgetown east via Walburg to SH 95 north of Granger.

On October 31, 1958, the road was extended east to Granger. On November 26, 1958, the road was extended further east to Friendship, replacing FM 971.

FM 973

FM 974

Farm to Market Road 974 (FM 974), is located in Brazos County. It is known locally as Tabor Road.

FM 974 was designated on November 23, 1948, from US 190 (present-day SH 21) north of Bryan to Tabor. On September 20, 1961, the designation was extended east to FM 2037 and FM 2038. On October 13, 1961, FM 974 was extended to US 190, replacing FM 2037. On June 27, 1995, the section from SH 21 to US 190 was redesignated Urban Road 974 (UR 974). The designation of that section reverted to FM 974 with the elimination of the Urban Road system on November 15, 2018.

Junction list

FM 975

Farm to Market Road 975 (FM 975) is located in Burleson County.

FM 975's northern terminus is in Caldwell at SH 21. Within city limits, it is also known as Banks Street. Upon passing over the Union Pacific Railroad tracks, the route curves southward and continues for another  before state maintenance ends at an intersection with County Road 125. The roadway continues as County Road 126.

FM 975 was designated on November 23, 1948, on its current route.

FM 976

FM 977

FM 978

FM 979

FM 980

FM 981

FM 982

FM 983

FM 984

FM 985

FM 986

Farm to Market Road 986 (FM 986) is located in Kaufman County.

FM 986 begins at an intersection with US 80 in Terrell and runs north along Rockwall Avenue then turns northeast on State Street before turning back north on Poetry Road. The highway leaves Terrell and runs in a generally north direction before turning northeast near County Road 246. FM 986 then intersects FM 1565 in Poetry, then continues to run northeast before ending at an intersection with County Road 2326.

On July 25, 1960, the highway was extended southward to US 80 when SH 205 was re-routed.

Junction list

FM 987

Farm to Market Road 987 (FM 987) is located in Kaufman County.

FM 987 begins at an intersection with SH 243 in Kaufman, running north on Jefferson Street before turning left onto Pyle Street and leaving the town. The highway travels in a generally northward direction through Post Oak Bend City before turning northwest. FM 987 intersects FM 2578 and continues to run northwest before ending at an intersection with FM 148 near Talty.

FM 987 was designated on November 23, 1948, running from US 175 (current SH 243) in Kaufman to FM 148 near Talty along its current route.

Junction list

FM 988

FM 988 (1948)

The original FM 988 was designated on November 23, 1948, from SH 274, south of Kemp, west . On July 15, 1949, a  section from Peeltown to the then-terminus of FM 988 was added. FM 988 was cancelled on November 1, 1961, and transferred to FM 148.

FM 989

Farm to Market Road 989 (FM 989), known locally as Kings Highway, is located in Bowie County. It is mostly located to the west of Texarkana.

However, on October 28, 1953, it was extended to include a  loop and connect with FM 559 northwest of Texarkana. On September 20, 1961, FM 989 was extended again, picking up an additional  on the south end, to connect to FM 2516. On June 27, 1995, the entire route of FM 989 was transferred to Urban Road 989. On November 21, 2013 a 0.3 mile section of FM 989 west of FM 2878 was turned over to the city of Texarkana and FM 989 was rerouted on a new route south of FM 559. The old route of FM 989 south of FM 559 became a section of FM 2878. The designation reverted to FM 989 with the elimination of the Urban Road system on November 15, 2018.

Junction list

FM 990

FM 991

Farm to Market Road 991 (FM 991) is located in Bowie County.

FM 991 was designated on November 21, 1956, from US 67 westward and southward to US 67 in Redwater. On June 28, 1963, it was extended south  from US 67, completing its current route.

FM 991 (1948)

This FM 991 was designated on November 23, 1948, from US 82 northwest to Daniel's Chapel School. On November 21, 1956, this FM 991 was cancelled and combined with FM 992, and the current FM 991 was created in the same county.

FM 992

FM 993

FM 994

FM 995

FM 996

Farm to Market Road 996 (FM 996) is located in Grayson County.

FM 996 begins at an intersection with FM 120 in Pottsboro. The highway runs south through the town as Grayson Street before turning east at Hagerman Road and leaves the town just east of Cardinal Lane. FM 996 continues to run east before ending at an intersection with FM 1417.

The current FM 996 was designated on October 31, 1958, running from FM 120 to FM 1417 with the mileage being transferred from FM 131. This section was cancelled when FM 120 was relocated with the completion of the northern extension of SH 289 on December 17, 2009.

FM 996 (1948)

FM 996 was first designated on November 23, 1948, running from SH 43 to FM 125. The highway was cancelled on May 6, 1952, with the mileage being transferred to FM 248.

FM 997

FM 998

FM 998 (1948)

FM 998 was cancelled on January 7, 1952, and transferred to FM 123.

FM 999

Farm to Market Road 999 (FM 999) is located in Panola County. It runs from FM 1971 to US 59.

FM 999 was designated on November 23, 1948, from SH 181 at Gary southwest . On June 29, 1950, the road was extended to US 59, replacing SH 181. On November 1, 1967, a break in the route was added at FM 1970. The final change was on November 3, 1972, when the road was extended to FM 1971.

Notes

References

+09
Farm to market roads 0900
Farm to Market Roads 0900